Liza Jane may refer to:
"Li'l Liza Jane", a traditional song
"Liza Jane" (David Bowie song)
"Liza Jane" (Vince Gill song)